Spelthorne is a constituency in Surrey represented in the House of Commons of the UK Parliament since 2010 by Kwasi Kwarteng, a Conservative, who served as Chancellor of the Exchequer for 38 days in September and October 2022.

Boundaries

1918–1945: The Urban Districts of Feltham, Hampton, Hampton Wick, Staines, Sunbury-on-Thames, and Teddington, and the Rural District of Staines.

1945–1950: The Urban Districts of Feltham, Staines, Sunbury-on-Thames, and Yiewsley and West Drayton.

1950–1955: The Urban Districts of Feltham, Staines, and Sunbury-on-Thames.

1955–1983: The Urban Districts of Staines and Sunbury-on-Thames.

1983–present: The Borough of Spelthorne (same content as above)

History of boundaries

Spelthorne was one of six hundreds of the historic county of Middlesex which covered its south west. It had thirteen historic parishes whereas the modern borough and seat has seven. The London Government Act 1963 placed the historic county in London except for two areas, one being the seven south-westernmost parishes of Spelthorne and Middlesex, placed since the commencement of the Act in April 1965 in Surrey.

From 1885 to 1918 it was in the inceptive Uxbridge seat, before which its electorate contributed to the two-seat Middlesex constituency since the 13th century creation of the House of Commons of England.

1918-1945
The seat was created by the Representation of the People Act 1918 and amounted to the larger, slightly less built-up part of the increasingly outer metropolitan Uxbridge seat which was split, in 1918, in two. It was given county seat status for unimportant logistical purposes. It amounted to the obsolete hundred plus the small west-to-east parishes in the north of Harmondsworth, Harlington and Cranford as the seat took in seven late 19th century-formed areas of local government, including the Staines Rural District. Due to the incursion into Elthorne Hundred the seat could have more accurately been named South West Middlesex.

1945-1950
For the post-war 1945 election the seat lost an eastern section: three of the historic parishes namely Hampton, Hampton Wick and Teddington to the Twickenham seat (which shifted substantially south, shedding Labour-leaning Hounslow).  The seat saw a northern exchange. It gained two small parishes (one of which, Yiewsley was of modern creation) to the NNW from its parent seat. It lost the similarly small Cranford and Harlington parishes to form, with parts of the parent seat, the new seat of Southall, which the incumbent for Spelthorne went on to represent in 1950.

1950-1955
In 1950 the seat was defined by the 1948 Act as the urban districts of Feltham, Staines and Sunbury on Thames; Yiewsley and West Drayton were returned to the Uxbridge seat.

1955 onwards
In the 1955 redistribution Feltham became the southwest of the new Feltham seat. Since 1955 the seat has comprised the former urban districts of Staines and Sunbury-on-Thames, added in local government to Surrey in 1965, and merged in 1974 to form in local government the Borough of Spelthorne.

The seat was categorised as a borough constituency from the February 1974 general election and for that election unaffected in the periodic redistribution. In 1995 the small settlement of Poyle, transferred from Buckinghamshire to the area in 1974 and long part of the possessions of Stanwell in Middlesex, was transferred to the Borough of Slough.

The Boundary Commission recommended no changes to this seat in their fully implemented Fifth Review for the 2010 election, nor in the draft 2018 Sixth Periodic Review of Westminster constituencies.

Constituency profile
The seat is south of Heathrow Airport bounded by a long meander of the Thames. It is a more built-up area with numerous but less expansive green spaces, fewer private roads and little woodland compared to further south in Surrey.  Some 30% is embanked reservoir or low-lying flood plain therefore immune against building. Contrasting with these large areas of fresh water, Surrey County Council have built a waste incinerator in Charlton in the seat and the 1970s saw the construction of the M3 and M25 motorways through the seat, the latter along its western border.

While relative to the county as a whole this borough is marginally less affluent, in national terms it is more affluent.  Workless claimants (registered jobseekers) were in November 2012 significantly lower than the national average of 3.8%, at 2.0% of the population based on a statistical compilation by The Guardian, only 0.3% higher than the affluent neighbouring constituency of Twickenham in London. Most residents can afford to buy their own homes: social housing accounts for only 10% of the total, and the proportion of professionals and managerial workers is high. Spelthorne has Labour's highest vote share of the eleven seats (30.5%) in the modern reduced definition of Surrey, where Stanwell is as at  the only County Council division (seat) held by a Labour councillor. Stanwell in common with Sunbury Common has significant social housing.

Spelthorne exceeds the average quota of commercial property of Surrey's seats — it contains about 20% of the county's commercial/industrial property, including large plants or wholesale units of Complete Cover Group, Kingston Technology, Edmundson Electrical, Esso Petroleum, Johnson & Johnson Vision Products, Thames Water, Shepperton Film Studios, wholesalers and storage companies.  Major offices/creative facilities of BP (its global HQ), Del Monte, NatWest, Samsung, Richmond Film Services and film/television ancillary businesses are in the constituency.

During the 2016 referendum on the UK's EU membership, the majority of voters in the area voted in favour of exiting the European Union. This was the preferred outcome of Spelthorne MP Kwasi Kwarteng.

History of results 

The 1918 to 1945 broadest, initial version of the parliamentary division saw no marginal majorities and can be squarely analysed as a Conservative safe seat based on length of party tenure and size of majorities.

In the 1945 general election George Pargiter (Lab) was elected in the Attlee Ministry landslide while the boundaries of the seat saw a favourable form to the party during expansion of London when the area extended to areas to the north, including Feltham and Bedfont (removed in 1955 — see Feltham and Heston) and had cast off Hampton, Hampton Wick and Teddington, before 1945 part of the seat.

Since the 1955 boundary reduction and a local emphasis or demand upon private housing relative to social housing, the reduced area has eight Conservative candidate majorities of greater than 11% and three lower majorities: 1966, 1997 and 2001.  The earliest of these produced the narrowest margin of victory, 5% of the vote. Based on length of party tenure and majorities the seat would be considered safe by most UK electoral analysts including of academic standing.

Members of Parliament
The constituency's first MP was Philip Pilditch, an architect who piloted the Ancient Monuments Act 1931 through Parliament: see Scheduled Monument.  The MP for Spelthorne since 2010 is the former Chancellor Kwasi Kwarteng.

Elections

Elections in the 2010s

Elections in the 2000s

Elections in the 1990s

Elections in the 1980s

Elections in the 1970s

Elections in the 1960s

Elections in the 1950s

Boundary changes

Elections in the 1940s

Elections in the 1930s

Elections in the 1920s

Elections in the 1910s

See also 
 List of parliamentary constituencies in Surrey

Notes

References

Sources
 Election result, 2010 (BBC)
 Election result, 2005 (BBC)
 Election results, 1997 - 2001 (BBC)
 Election results, 1997 - 2001  (Election Demon)
 Election results, 1983 - 1992  (Election Demon)
 Election results, 1992 - 2010 (Guardian)
 Election results, 1945 - 1979 (Politics Resources)
 Boundaries of Parliamentary Constituencies 1885-1972, compiled and edited by F.W.S. Craig (Parliamentary Reference Publications 1972)
 Britain Votes 4: British Parliamentary Election Results 1983-1987, compiled and edited by F.W.S. Craig (Parliamentary Research Services 1988)
 Britain Votes 5: British Parliamentary Election Results 1988-1992, compiled and edited by Colin Rallings and Michael Thrasher (Parliamentary Research Services/Dartmouth Publishing 1993)
 British Parliamentary Election Results 1918-1949, compiled and edited by F.W.S. Craig (Macmillan Press, revised edition 1977)
 British Parliamentary Election Results 1950-1973, compiled and edited  by F.W.S. Craig (Parliamentary Research Services 1983).
 British Parliamentary Election Results 1974-1983, compiled and edited by F.W.S. Craig (Parliamentary Research Services 1984)
 Who's Who of British Members of Parliament, Volume III 1919-1945, edited by M. Stenton and S. Lees (Harvester Press 1979)
 Who's Who of British Members of Parliament, Volume IV 1945-1979, edited by M. Stenton and S. Lees (Harvester Press 1981)

External links 
 Spelthorne Labour Party
 Spelthorne Conservatives
 Spelthorne Lib Dems
 Spelthorne Trade Unionist and Socialist Coalition

Parliamentary constituencies in South East England
Borough of Spelthorne
Constituencies of the Parliament of the United Kingdom established in 1918
Politics of Surrey